Prefuse 73 Reads the Books E.P. is a collaborative EP by Prefuse 73 and The Books. It was released on Warp in 2005. "Pagina Ocho" features a vocal contribution from Claudia Maria Deheza. Prefuse 73's third studio album, Surrounded by Silence, includes "Pagina Dos" from the EP, as well as many other collaborations with artists other than The Books. The EP peaked at number 23 on the Billboard Top Dance/Electronic Albums chart.

Critical reception
At Metacritic, which assigns a weighted average score out of 100 to reviews from mainstream critics, the EP received an average score of 71% based on 8 reviews, indicating "generally favorable reviews".

Noel Dix of Exclaim! said, "If you dig the sensitive side of Prefuse's work, which is usually some of his most genius attempts, then this EP is essential."

Track listing

Charts

References

External links
 

2005 EPs
Prefuse 73 EPs
The Books albums
Warp (record label) EPs